de la Fuente is a Spanish language surname, which means "of the fountain," "of the spring" or "of the source." It may refer to:

People
Antonio Gutiérrez de la Fuente (1796–1878), Peruvian politician
Claire de la Fuente (born 1958), Filipino singer
Cristián de la Fuente (born 1974), Chilean model and actor
David de la Fuente (born 1981), Spanish cyclist
David Hernández de la Fuente (born 1974), Spanish writer
Dianne dela Fuente (born 1981), Filipino newscaster
Enrique de la Fuente (born 1975), Spanish volleyball player
Esteban de la Fuente (born 1968), Argentine basketball player
Félix Rodríguez de la Fuente (1928–1980), Spanish naturalist
Fernando de la Fuente de la Fuente (1943–1996), Spanish missionary and martyr
 Gertrudis de la Fuente (1921-2017), Spanish biochemist 
Guillermo Jullian de la Fuente (1931–2008), Chilean architect and painter
Gregorio de la Fuente (1910-1999), Chilean painter and muralist
Ignacio De La Fuente (born 1949), American politician
Jerónimo de la Fuente (born 1991), Argentine rugby player
Joel de la Fuente (born 1969), American actor
José Ramón de la Fuente (born 1970), Spanish football player and coach
Juan de la Fuente (born 1976), Argentine sailor
Juan Ramón de la Fuente (born 1951), Mexican psychiatrist and politician
Konrad de la Fuente (born 2001), American soccer player
Luis de la Fuente (1914–1972), Mexican footballer
Luis de la Fuente Castillo (1961–), Spanish footballer
Luis Herrera de la Fuente (1916–2014), Mexican musician
Luis Merlo de la Fuente, Spanish politician
Luis Solari de la Fuente (born 1948), Peruvian politician 
Ramón de la Fuente Muñiz (1921–2006), Mexican psychiatrist
Rafael de la Fuente (born 1986), Venezuelan actor and singer
Rocky De La Fuente (born 1954), American businessman and politician
Rodrigo de la Fuente (born 1976), Spanish basketball player
Sergio García de la Fuente (born 1983), Spanish football player
Vicente Iborra de la Fuente (born 1988), Spanish football player

Places
Fresno de la Fuente, Segovia, Spain
Jaramillo de la Fuente, Burgos, Spain
Parras de la Fuente, Coahuila, Mexico
Santibáñez de La Fuente, León, Spain
Valhermoso de la Fuente, Cuenca, Spain
Villanueva de la Fuente, Spain

See also
Fuente (disambiguation)
Lafuente (disambiguation)

Surnames
Spanish-language surnames